Babatunde Luqmon Adekunle (born 10 October 1984 in Lagos) is a Nigerian footballer.

Career 
Lukmon played as 20–year–old in the 2004–05 First League of Serbia and Montenegro with FK Borac Čačak and moved one year later to FK Vëllazërimi Kičevo in Macedonia. From June 2006 to December 2008, he was under contract by FK Rabotnički where he contributed a lot to the success of the team, playing a big part in the Qualifiers to the UEFA Champions League 2008–09.

On 22 December 2008, the Swiss Super League Club confirmed the signing of Lukmon on a four-and-a-half year contract with FC Luzern after a Swiss agent discovered him in a Champions League qualifying match against FC Inter Baku in Azerbaijan and brought him to FC Luzern. He got off to a sensational start with the team in the beginning of 2009.

In summer 2011, after having already played two league matches for Luzern in the 2011–12 season, Lukmon agreed to a one-year loan deal to play for SC Kriens in the Swiss Challenge League. At SC Kriens in the 2011–12 season he played 13 times in total for the club while on loan

On July 1, 2014 Adekunle signed for Swiss team Zug 94 having been released by FC Luzern. He scored his first goal for his new club against FC Grenchen in a 9-0 win.

Honours
FK Rabotnički
 First Macedonian Football League: 2007–08
 Macedonian Cup: 2007–08

FC Luzern
Swiss Cup Runner Up: 2011-12

References

External links
 
 
 
 Profile at Srbijafudbal 

1984 births
Living people
Sportspeople from Lagos
Yoruba sportspeople
Association football defenders
Nigerian footballers
FK Borac Čačak players
FK Vëllazërimi 77 players
FK Rabotnički players
FC Luzern players
SC Kriens players
Swiss Super League players
Nigerian expatriate footballers
Expatriate footballers in Serbia and Montenegro
Nigerian expatriate sportspeople in Serbia
Expatriate footballers in North Macedonia
Nigerian expatriate sportspeople in North Macedonia
Expatriate footballers in Switzerland
Nigerian expatriate sportspeople in Switzerland
21st-century Nigerian people